Belle Adler is an associate professor of journalism at Northeastern University School of Journalism. Adler specializes in television news. Before teaching at the university, Adler was a local television news executive where she was an investigative producer and tape editor. She had previously been employed by several broadcasting stations like KGO-TV, WCBS-TV, and KQED and cable stations like CNN, A&E, Discovery Channel, and Animal Planet. Adler has won two Northern California Emmy’s for her work.

Documentaries
Belle Adler specialized in documentary productions and is credited with producing Murder for Hire for the Discovery Channel and American Dream, American Nightmare for A&E's Investigative Reports, narrated by Bill Kurtis. In 2002, Adler produced Operation Animal Shield for Animal Planet and Discovery International. Adler said she wanted to "create an educational documentary that gave others the opportunity to see what a huge problem poaching is in other countries." Adler was the research director for Drugs on Public Lands, an A&E production.

Awards and honors
Adler was awarded fellowships and honors with the Aircraft Owners and Pilots Association, who honored Adler in 2002 with an AOPA award for Best Documentary for "Operation Animal Shield" which documented efforts to catch elephant and rhino poachers in East Africa. She earned a Sidney Hillman Foundation award in 2001 for her documentary "American Dream, American Nightmare". This report investigated the effects of the 1996 Immigration Reform Acts on legal resident aliens in the United States, resulting in INS reviews of the cases investigated. Adler was a winner and participant of two fellowships: The William Benton Fellowship at the University of Chicago and the Jefferson Fellowship at the East/West Center of the University of Hawaii in Oahu.

References

External links
 Operation Animal Shield Poster

American documentary filmmakers
American film producers
American journalism academics
Living people
Northeastern University faculty
University at Buffalo alumni
Year of birth missing (living people)